Wilder is an unincorporated community in Johnson County, Kansas, United States, and part of the Kansas City metropolitan area.

History
Wilder was named for E. Wilder, a railroad employee.

A post office was opened in Wilder in 1875, and remained in operation until it was discontinued in 1952.

References

Further reading

External links
 Johnson County maps: Current, Historic, KDOT

Unincorporated communities in Johnson County, Kansas
Unincorporated communities in Kansas